Ochodnica (until 1899 ) is a village and municipality in Kysucké Nové Mesto District in the Zilina Region of northern Slovakia.

History
In historical records the village was first mentioned in 1598.

Geography
The municipality lies at an altitude of 403 metres and covers an area of 18.052km². It has a population of about 1,027 people.

References

External links
Ochodnica Local website (in Slovak)

Villages and municipalities in Kysucké Nové Mesto District